Luciana Alves dos Santos (born 10 February 1970) is a Brazilian long jumper, triple jumper and sprinter.

She was born in Ilhéus. She competed in the long jump at the World Championships in 1997 and 1999, and in both events at the 2000 Summer Olympics, but without reaching the final. At the 2004 Olympics she competed in the 4 x 100 metre relay.

She has four Brazilian titles; one in the long jump from 1996 and three in the triple jump from 1999, 2000 and 2001. Her main rivals were Maria de Souza and Maurren Higa Maggi. On the regional level, she has eleven medals in the individual events from the South American Championships in 1991, 1995, 1997, 1999, 2001, 2003 and 2005.

Her personal best jump is 6.66 metres, achieved in June 2007 in La Paz. This is a former South American record. She has 6.81 metres in the long jump, achieved in June 1999 in Bogotá; and 11.40 seconds metres in the 100 metres, achieved in May 2004 in Cochabamba.

Competition record

References

1970 births
Living people
Brazilian female long jumpers
Brazilian female triple jumpers
Brazilian female sprinters
Athletes (track and field) at the 2000 Summer Olympics
Athletes (track and field) at the 2004 Summer Olympics
Olympic athletes of Brazil
Athletes (track and field) at the 1999 Pan American Games
Athletes (track and field) at the 2007 Pan American Games
Competitors at the 1995 Summer Universiade
Pan American Games athletes for Brazil
People from Ilhéus
Sportspeople from Bahia
21st-century Brazilian women
20th-century Brazilian women